Elections were held on November 2, 1937 to fill the New York City Council, which had just been formed to replace the New York City Board of Aldermen. The new Council comprised 26 members elected via proportional representation by borough, in contrast to the 65-member Board of Aldermen elected by district. This was done in response to the large majorities the Democrats often received in the Board of Aldermen. Each borough was entitled to one member of the council for each 75,000 votes cast, and an additional member for each remainder greater than 50,000. Brooklyn was entitled to nine members of the Council, Manhattan six, Queens and The Bronx five each, and Richmond one.

Owing to the novelty and complexity of proportional representation the results of the election were expected to be significantly slowed down, and were not available until later in the month. Manhattan elected three Democrats, one Republican, one member of the City Fusion party, and one member of the American Labor Party.

John Cashmore of Brooklyn, who had served seven terms in the Board of Aldermen, was elected the Vice Chairman and consequently leader of the majority. The Board of Aldermen held its last meeting on December 21, and the new City Council met for the first time on January 3, 1938. Proportional representation was abolished in 1947 as it allowed Communists to be elected to the Council.

The electoral reform nonprofit organization FairVote says, of the New York council election results during that period: "The City’s first black candidates were elected (including Adam Clayton Powell Jr.) [in 1945], seats were won in close proportion to votes and far more small party candidates and independent Democrats were elected."

References

Notes

1937 United States local elections
New York City Council elections
1937 New York (state) elections